This page lists public opinion polls conducted for the 2007 French legislative elections, which were held in two rounds on 10 and 17 June 2007.

Unless otherwise noted, all polls listed below are compliant with the regulations of the national polling commission (Commission nationale des sondages) and utilize the quota method.

Graphical summary 
The averages in the graphs below were constructed using polls listed below conducted by the five major French pollsters. The graphs are smoothed 14-day weighted moving averages, using only the most recent poll conducted by any given pollster within that range (each poll weighted based on recency).

First round 
During the 2007 presidential election, Ipsos launched the first ever rolling poll in France, described as a "continuous electoral barometer", which it continued to carry out for the legislative elections in June.

Other far-left parties received 0.32% of the vote in the first round in 2002; this total is included in the total for miscellaneous candidates, which would otherwise be 0.84%. Results for the Citizen and Republican Movement are compared with those of the Republican Pole in 2002, and Liberal Democracy and Rally for France are included in the miscellaneous right total for that year, which would otherwise be 3.89%; the two parties received 0.42% and 0.36% of the vote, respectively.

Second round seat projections 
Projections marked with an asterisk (*) are for 555 deputies representing metropolitan France. The final three Ipsos projections were constructed using interviews in 184 constituencies with left-right duels where the outcome appeared uncertain, while the two preceding projections were based on 197 constituencies.

Seats for Liberal Democracy and Rally for France are included in the miscellaneous right total for 2002, which would otherwise be 9; the parties each won 2 seats.

By second round configuration 
Configurations tested before the first were collected among a national sample, except for the Ipsos poll conducted on 13 June 2007 which was conducted specifically in 17 constituencies where a victory for a French Communist Party candidate was considered possible.

PS/PCF/LV–UMP/NC

PS/PCF/LV–MoDem–UMP

PCF–UMP/NC

By constituency

First round

Ardèche's 2nd

Drôme's 2nd

Eure's 3rd

Gironde's 2nd

Isère's 1st

Pyrénées-Atlantiques's 2nd 
Jean-Pierre Mariné withdrew and did not contest the second round despite being eligible to after the decision of the party to allow Bayrou to carry the constituency.

Saône-et-Loire's 6th

Sarthe's 4th

Paris's 8th

Vaucluse's 4th

Second round

Ardèche's 2nd

Drôme's 2nd

Eure's 3rd 
Hervé Morin was directly elected in the first round on 10 June 2007.

Gironde's 2nd

Isère's 1st

Pyrénées-Atlantiques's 2nd

Saône-et-Loire's 6th

Paris's 8th

Vaucluse's 4th

See also 
Opinion polling for the French presidential election, 2007
Opinion polling for the French legislative election, 2012
Opinion polling for the French legislative election, 2017

References

External links 
Notices of the French polling commission 

Opinion polling in France
France